The Presidential Award for Excellence in Science, Mathematics and Engineering Mentoring (PAESMEM) is a Presidential award established by the United States White House in 1995. The program is administered by the National Science Foundation (NSF) on behalf of the White House Office of Science and Technology Policy (OSTP) to reward outstanding mentoring by individuals and organizations. PAESMEM is the highest national mentoring award bestowed by the White House.

Recipients
1996 – Richard A. Tapia
1997 – Geraldine L. Richmond
1998 – Nina Roscher
2000 – Maria Elena Zavala
2003 – 
Individual – Linda B. Hayden, Margaret Werner-Washburne
Organisation – Karl W. Reid (National Society of Black Engineers)
2005 – Lenore Blum, Rosemary Gillespie, Cheryl B. Schrader
2007 
Individual – Jerzy Leszczynski, Kennedy Reed, Kenneth Sajwan, Laura Bottomley, Lesia Crumpton-Young, Mary Anne Nelson, Patricia DeLeon, Steven Oppenheimer
Organisation – Medeva Ghee (The Leadership Alliance & The Partnership for Minority Science Education)
2008 – Richard Zare, Susan M. Kauzlarich
2009 – Maja Matarić
2011 – Juan E. Gilbert, Jo Handelsman, Mary Lou Soffa
2014 – Erika Tatiana Camacho, Keivan Stassun
2015 
Organisation – EDGE Foundation
2018 – Ulrica Wilson
2020 - Overtoun Jenda

STEM mentoring
Mentoring in the STEM fields has been shown to assist with student retention, a significant problem in the STEM pipeline.

See also
 Awards and decorations of the United States government
 Computer science
 Computing
 Engineering
 Math
 Science
 Technology

References

External links
Official site
National Science Foundation Program page

National Science Foundation
Mentorships
American science and technology awards